Vadim Alexandrovich Peare, known professionally as DJ Vadim, is a Russian-English DJ and record producer. Born in Saint Petersburg and raised in London, Peare is additionally a promoter, record collector, radio presenter, occasional painter and writer, whose music combines hip hop, soul, reggae and electronica. He previously ran Jazz Fudge.

Peare's music combines hip hop, soul, reggae, and electronica. He has been described as "one of the few artists creating genuinely new work in the Hip-Hop field" and an artist who "cannot be ignored".

Career
In 1994, Vadim founded his own independent record label, Jazz Fudge, but signed to Ninja Tune the following year, before his current label BBE, in 2007.  Aside from DJing and producing, he has also worked as in A&R and promotion, as well as a radio presenter on the BBC's Around the World in Eight Relays programme.

Throughout his career, he has worked with a variety of musicians, singers and groups, including DJ Krush, Stevie Wonder, The Roots, Prince, Public Enemy, Dilated Peoples, Kraftwerk, Sly and the family stone, Fat Freddys Drop, Super Furry Animals, and Paul Weller.  He is also known for having worked with a number of unsigned artists who later went on to find commercial success.

In addition to his regular album releases, he has also recorded under the names "Andre Gurov" and "Little Aida" and has appeared as a member of the various artists project The Isolationist.  He is also the DJ and producer for Spanish hip hop group 7 Notas 7 Colores, and, in 2001, was nominated alongside them at the Latin Grammy Awards.

His album, U.S.S.R. Life from the Other Side, featured Scratch Perverts, Iriscience (from Dilated Peoples), Blade.  To promote the record, Vadim put together a live group - The Russian Percussion - consisting of Mr Thing (turntables), Killa Kela (beat box), Blu Rum 13 (MC), John Ellis (keyboards).  The tour consisted of 200 live shows taking in twenty four countries throughout Europe and North America.

He is the founder member of the hip-hop group One Self. Their album, Children of Possibility, was released on Ninja Tune Records in 2005.
U Can't Lurn Imaginashun was his return on BBE records in May 2009 that featured the single "Soldier" by Big Red (MC). To promote the record, Vadim put a live group together consisting of Sabira Jade (singer), Ste Keyz (Keyboardist), Pugs Atomz (MC). They would later become a group called The Electric and put out an album called Life is Moving on Vadim's on imprint Organically Grown Sounds (OGS) in 2010. His album, Don’t Be Scared (BBE, 2012) was praised for the "inventiveness of the beats" (incorporating dubstep, breaks, bhangra, Afrobeat and vintage house) by Q reviewer Paul McGee who rated it 4/5 and tagged "The One to Buy!"

He has made many remixes from The Cure, Erykah Badu, Alice Russell, Paul Weller, Prince, and CL Smooth.

On average he performs 170-180 shows a year and has played in over 63 countries.

In 2020, Vadim was interviewed by the Data.Wave webzine.

Style
DJ Vadim composes both music for MCs, singers and poets and soulful instrumental hip-hop beats.  In both cases, certain stylistic trends emerge;
 Dominating rhythmic percussion, heavy use of drum programming which are sometimes broken or stuttering, heavy bass and synthesizer use.
 Organic, soulful touches often using studio musicians, with undertones of roots reggae and ragga and driving, hip-hop drum orchestration.
 Original sounding compositions, arrangements that fuse many genres from hip-hop and electronica to soul and reggae.
 Heavy use of ethnic sounds, including Asian, South American and African.
"Anyone recalling Sly & Robbie's mid-80s exercises in electro-dub fusion might see DJ Vadim’s latest as almost an update of that aesthetic," Paul McGee wrote in Q, reviewing Don’t Be Scared LP (2012).

Discography

DJ Vadim
Studio albums
 U.S.S.R. Repertoire (Ninja Tune, 1996)
 U.S.S.R. Reconstruction (Ninja Tune, 1998)
 U.S.S.R. Life from the Other Side (Ninja Tune, 1999)
 U.S.S.R. Instrumental to Life (Ninja Tune, 1999)
 U.S.S.R. The Art of Listening (Ninja Tune, 2002)
 U.S.S.R. The Art of Instrumentals (Ninja Tune, 2002)
 The Soundcatcher (BBE, 2007)
 U Can't Lurn Imaginashun (BBE, 2009)
 Don't Be Scared (BBE, 2012)
 Dubcatcher (BBE, 2014)
 Grow Slow (BBE, 2015) 
 Dubcatcher 2 (Soulbeats Records, 2016)
Dubcatcher Vol. 3 (Flames up!)  (Soulbeats Records, 2018)

Compilation albums
 DJ Vadim Presents: Sculpture and Broken Sound (P-Vine Records, 1997)
 Architects of the Great (Jazz Fudge, 1998)
 The Forgotten Women/Stereo Pictures (MK2, 2003)
 Lettuce Propelled Rockets (JFM, 2005)
 Live in Brooklyn (Mothergrain, 2007)

EPs
 Abstract Hallucinating Gases (Jazz Fudge, 1995)
 Headz Ain't Ready (Jazz Fudge, 1995)
 Bang 2K (Ninja Tune, 2002)

Singles
 "Nonlateral Hypothesis" (Ninja Tune, 1996)
 "Aural Prostitution" (Ninja Tune, 1996)
 "Heterogeneous" / "Nocturnal Thought Tracks" (Jazz Fudge, 1996)
 "Conquest of the Irrational" (Ninja Tune, 1997)
 "Friction" (Ninja Tune, 1999)
 "It's Obvious" (Ninja Tune, 1999)
 "Your Revolution" / "The Higher Standard" (Ninja Tune, 2000)
 "Leaches" / "Up to Jah" (Ninja Tune, 2002)
 "Combustible" / "Ghetto Rebels" / "Dimelo es el Verbo" (Ninja Tune, 2002)
 "It's On" (Ninja Tune, 2002)
 "Edie Brickell" / "Cum Shots" (Ninja Tune, 2003)
 "Till Suns in Your Eyes" / "Headline News" (Ninja Tune, 2003)
 "Explode" (JFM, 2005)
 "Like the Wind" / "Boom Sumting" (BBE, 2007)
 "Got to Rock" / "Black Is the Night" (BBE, 2007)
 "Talk to Me" / "Like the Wind" (BBE, 2008)
 "Hidden Treasure" / "Saturday" / "Soldier" (BBE, 2009)
 "This DJ" (BBE, 2012)
 "The Terrorist" (Ninja Tune, 2010)
 "Hope" (BBE, 2014)
 "Black Is the Night" (BBE, 2015)
 "Fussin n' Fighting" (Soulbeats Records, 2015)

Little Aida
EPs
 Confessions (Jazz Fudge, 1996)

Andre Gurov
EPs
 Revelations of Wrath (Jazz Fudge, 1997)
 A New Rap Language (Jazz Fudge, 1997)

The Bug
Albums
 Taping the Conversation (Wordsound, 1997)

The Isolationist
Albums
 The Isolationist (Jazz Fudge, 1999)

Singles
 "Hydrogen Slush" (Jazz Fudge, 1998)

Blixton Rodriguez
EPs
 August Showers (2005)

One Self
Albums
 Children of Possibility (Ninja Tune, 2005)
 Children of Instrumentals (Ninja Tune, 2005)

EPs
 Organically Grown (2006)

Singles
 "Be Your Own" (Ninja Tune, 2005)
 "The Blue Bird" / "Fear the Labour" (Ninja Tune, 2005)
 "Paranoid" / "Over Expose" / "Come Along" (Ninja Tune, 2005)

The Electric
Albums
 Life Is Moving (Organically Grown Sounds, 2011)

EPs
 Plug It In (Organically Grown Sounds, 2010)
 Toot Toot (Organically Grown Sounds, 2011)

Singles
 "Beautiful" (Organically Grown Sounds, 2010)

Productions
 Part 2 - "Automatic (DJ Vadim Remix)" and "Temperamental" from Prelude to Cycle 6 (1997)
 Silc - "Platina (DJ Vadim Mix)" (1999)
 7 Notas 7 Colores - "Rocks Eddy" and "Pónmelo Duro" from 77 (1999)
 Swollen Members - "English Breakfast" from Monsters in the Closet (2002)
 TTC - "De Pauvres Riches" from Ceci N'est Pas Un Disque (2002)
 DJ Cam - "Innervisions (DJ Vadim Remix)" from Revisited By (2005)
 Foreign Beggars - "Black Hole Prophecies" from Stray Point Agenda (2006)
 Смоки Мо - "Салют" from Планета 46 (2006)
 Alice Russell - "Fly in the Hand (DJ Vadim Mix)" (2006)
 Belleruche - "Northern Girls (DJ Vadim Mix)" (2008)
 Панда - "Наука И Жизнь" from Кругозор (2010)
 The Glitch Mob - "Fortune Days (DJ Vadim Remix)" from Drink the Sea: The Remixes (2011)
 Sifu Versus - "Ανάβει Πράσινο" (2012)
 Yarah Bravo - "Freedom Fighters" and "Fuerza" from Love Is the Movement (2014)
 The Mouse Outfit - "Step Steadier (DJ Vadim Remix)" from Remixed (2016)

References

External links
 
 
 

British hip hop DJs
Ninja Tune artists
Russian emigrants to the United Kingdom
DJs from London
Living people
Year of birth missing (living people)